The Black Rock Beacon is newspaper made by and for burners. It was started in 2005 by former staff members of the Black Rock Gazette when that newspaper no longer received funding from the Burning Man LLC. This event is viewed in contrary ways by both parties. While the Burning Man organization claims it and the Gazette staff mutually decided to pursue "separate missions,"  the Beacon founders feel they were effectively fired.

The newspaper aims to publish daily editions during the annual Burning Man event. The Black Rock Beacon itself is ad-free and is funded through donations, though the paper does accept advertising on its web site. All of its content is made available under a Creative Commons license.

In 2009, after an unprecedented 130 theme camps were denied reserved campsites by the Burning Man Organization, the Black Rock Beacon published an "Alternative What Where When" guide at Burning Man. Unplaced camps were able to list their addresses and events in the AWWW in a manner similar to that for placed camps in Black Rock City's official What Where When publication.

Notable Contributors
Lawrence M. Breed, co-founder, director, chief copy editor.

Ron Garmon, director, reporter.

References

External links
 Black Rock Beacon website
 Black Rock Gazette archive on the Burning Man website

Burning Man